Anthony Zucco is a fictional character appearing in American comic books published by DC Comics. First appearing in Detective Comics #38 (April 1940), Zucco is a mobster responsible for murdering the parents of Dick Grayson, which leads to Grayson's adoption by Bruce Wayne a.k.a. Batman and becoming the latter's sidekick and original Robin and Nightwing.

The character has appeared in Batman: The Animated Series, voiced by Thomas F. Wilson, and The Batman, voiced by Mark Hamill. Richard Zeppieri portrayed him in the first season of the DC Universe series Titans.

Publication history
Tony Zucco first appeared in Detective Comics #38 (April 1940) and was created by Bob Kane, Bill Finger, and Jerry Robinson.

Fictional character history

Pre-Crisis
Antonio Zucco (originally just "Boss Zucco" in his first appearance) is a Mafia crime boss or simple low level thug (his position of power varies depending upon the Golden and Silver Age continuity) in Gotham City who is responsible for the death of Dick Grayson's parents. Throughout the years, Zucco's role in Robin's origin remains largely the same.

Earth-Two
Zucco tries to extort the Haly's Circus, where the Flying Graysons are the main attraction. When the ringmaster C.C. Haly (who runs an honest business) refuses to pay him protection money, Zucco has his henchman Blade sabotage the trapeze ropes the Graysons use in their act. The ropes break while John and Mary Graysons are in mid-air. Because the Graysons perform their act without a safety net, they fall to their deaths. This caused C.C. Haly to pay him protection money to prevent any further "accidents". After overhearing Blade talking to Zucco about committing the sabotage, Dick is subsequently adopted by Bruce Wayne (a.k.a. Batman) and becomes his partner Robin. Both of them locate Tony Zucco where they defeated his henchmen. Robin was able to secretly record Zucco punishing his henchman Blade by pushing him off the skyscraper. The police used this as evidence to arrest Zucco. Afterwards, Robin becomes Batman's sidekick.

Many years later, Zucco was seen in the hospital where he has become senile. At the time when he was under the influence of the Stream of Ruthlessness, Robin combated Infinity, Inc. to get to Tony Zucco and finish him off. When he does get to Tony Zucco, Robin finds that he does not recognize him.

Earth-One
On Earth-One, Tony Zucco's history and his showdown with Batman and Robin is the same as his Earth-Two counterpart.

Post-Crisis

Batman: Year Three
Dick Grayson's narration establishes Zucco's backstory. A first-generation immigrant from Italy, Zucco is orphaned at a young age when a gang of criminals murder his parents for refusing to pay protection money. Zucco is sent to an orphanage, where he is cared for by Sister Mary Elizabeth. She tries to counsel Zucco, but he is a lost cause; consumed by anger, he prays only for the deaths of the men who killed his parents. As a young man, he runs away from the orphanage and joins one of Gotham's major crime families, and quickly moves up Gotham's criminal food chain.

After Batman apprehends him for murdering Dick Grayson's parents, Zucco is sentenced to two consecutive life terms in Blackgate Penitentiary. After serving seven years of his sentence, he files for a parole hearing and offers testimony against other Gotham criminals. He professes remorse for his crimes, but hides an ulterior motive. Before he was sent to prison, Zucco had hidden a ledger in the orphanage where Dick briefly resided following his parents' deaths; the ledger contains incriminating information about the Mafia's operations in Gotham. Zucco plots to remove the ledger from the orphanage before it is demolished. Wanting to keep the truth from Dick (who has recently become Nightwing), Alfred Pennyworth goes to the parole hearing and pleads for the judge to keep Zucco in prison, but Dick soon learns of Zucco's release. Despite Alfred's attempts to stop him, Dick races to Blackgate to confront his parents' killer. As he steps out of the prison, Zucco is gunned down by a helicopter hired by a rival crime boss. While Zucco's death gives Dick some closure, his already-strained relationship with Batman becomes further complicated. When Dick presses him, Batman insists he knows nothing about Zucco's murder.

Batman: Dark Victory
In Batman: Dark Victory, Zucco (dubbed Anthony "Fats" Zucco) is portrayed as a low-level thug working for Sal Maroni, a member of Carmine Falcone's Mafia empire. He and another minor family head, Edward Skeevers, are put in charge of drug smuggling. After constant attacks by other enemies such as Penguin, Zucco starts a new method of smuggling these drugs. He only lets Skeevers in on the secret, believing that its success will make their minor families greater than the Falcones and the Maronis put together, and attempts to take over Haley's Circus to use its trucks for his smuggling activities. He kills Dick Grayson's parents as a demonstration of power to the circus' owner, and then quickly goes underground. He is later found by Batman and Dick Grayson, who is not yet Robin, and is chased down a dark alley by Grayson until he has a heart attack, confessing to various crimes before dying.

Blackest Night

Tony Zucco's remains have been reanimated as a Black Lantern in DC Comics's 2009–2010 crossover Blackest Night, with John and Mary Grayson, Jack and Janet Drake, Captain Boomerang, and the deceased members of the original Dark Knight's rogue gallery. Dick Grayson and Tim Drake, who have become the new Batman and Red Robin, respectively face down Zucco and their parent's corpses. Dick eventually cryogenically suspends himself and Tim during the battle, which forces the Black Lanterns to retreat as they are unable to read any signs of life from them.

The Black Mirror
In The Black Mirror, it is revealed that Zucco had fathered a daughter named Sonia. She is seemingly a legitimate businesswoman and runs the GGM Bank under the alias of Sonia Branch. Dick Grayson, who had recently become the new Batman, initially hopes that Sonia is not as corrupt as her father. However, he is disappointed when he realizes that Sonia manipulated him into subduing rivals who wish to take over her bank. Due to the lack of evidence, Sonia remains beyond the reach of the law.

The New 52

In The New 52 (a reboot of DC Universe's continuity), a young Dick Grayson sees Tony Zucco threatening C.C. Haly for protection money. When Haly refuses to pay, Zucco sabotages the trapeze, which causes John and Mary Grayson to fall to their deaths. Dick becomes obsessed with finding Zucco and roams the streets of Gotham City looking for him, eventually encountering Batman and learning that the Dark Knight and his new guardian Bruce Wayne are the same person. Tony is still the father of Sonia Zucco in this continuity, and she and Dick have a tenuous relationship.

Zucco had disappeared soon after his arrest and is presumed dead, but Sonia receives an e-mail saying that her father is still alive and living in Chicago, and relays this information to Dick.

Zucco is revealed to be working for Chicago Mayor Wallace Cole under the alias Billy Lester. Cole knows of Zucco's criminal record, and years before covered it up by having him declared officially dead. When Nightwing arrives in Chicago, Cole tells a panicked Zucco to go into hiding. Nightwing discovers "Billy Lester"'s true identity, and learns that his parents' murderer has a wife and son.

Nightwing shows up in Cole's office, demanding to know why he is protecting Zucco. He then secretly bugs Cole's office. Soon afterward, the Prankster addresses the whole city by video and reveals that Cole has been harboring Zucco for three years. When Zucco learns what has happened, he returns to Chicago to help Nightwing. Zucco tells Nightwing that he murdered Harold Loomis, the man who engineered the city's transportation system, on Cole's orders. He then explains that Prankster is Loomis' son, and he plans to blow up city hall as revenge; he also sent Sonia the email about Zucco to make sure Nightwing got involved. Nightwing and Zucco defuse the explosives and get Cole to safety, and Nightwing fights the Prankster. Zucco saves Nightwing's life by shooting and wounding the Prankster. He is then arrested for murdering Loomis. In jail, Zucco receives a visit from a man who suggests that his employers can help him beat the rap. Zucco insists that he wants to take responsibility to set a good example for his son. The man says there is no point in that, as Zucco's family has left him.

Infinite Frontier
In the Infinite Frontier Nightwing series, Zucco appeared to have another daughter named Melinda Zucco who is a newly-appointed mayor of Blüdhaven. However, later issues revealed that Tony is not Melinda's father, but rather John Grayson while making both her and Nightwing half-siblings.

Melinda's mother, Meili Lin revealed that after she was forced to marry Tony, she ran away from him while visiting the circus where she was helped by John and Mary. Meili would travelled with the circus and had a short relationship with John which resulted getting pregnant with Melinda. Eventually Tony managed to tracked her down and bring her back to Blüdhaven. Months later Meili gave birth to Melinda with Zucco always having known that Melinda wasn't his daughter. After Meili and Melinda left Zucco years later and offered protection from the Maroni Crime Family, Zucco later killed both John and Mary and leaving Dick an orphan, in which Dick comes to realise that Zucco killed them out of revenge rather than owning him money.

Other versions

All Star Batman and Robin
In Frank Miller's All Star Batman and Robin the Boy Wonder, Dick Grayson's parents are killed by a low-level hitman named "Jocko-boy" Vanzetti. Throughout the early issues, Batman brutalizes Vanzetti, going so far as to torture him with snake venom-coated batarangs that cause terrifying hallucinations. Batman brings Vanzetti to the Batcave and allows Dick Grayson to "interrogate" him with an axe. Under this torture, Vanzetti reveals that the Joker ordered the hit. Afterwards, Batman throws Vanzetti into Gotham Bay with his hands tied behind his back, though Jocko-boy is later seen climbing out.

Earth 3
In the Earth 3 universe, as seen during the "Forever Evil" storyline, Anthony Zucco is a clown who owns a circus. He is killed by Jonathan Grayson, who uses the circus as a front for his criminal activities.

In other media

Television
 Tony Zucco appeared in the Batman: The Animated Series two-part episode "Robin's Reckoning", voiced by Thomas F. Wilson. This version is a nephew of Connie Stromwell, the former wife of Rupert Thorne's rival Arnold Stromwell. Tony Zucco's aliases include Billy Marin, Simon Dirks, Sid the Squid, Killer Coburn, and Punky Lesh. As in the comics, he threatens Haly's Circus' owner Mr. Haly for protection money and kills Dick Grayson's parents by sabotaging the trapeze ropes after Haly violently refuses him. After Bruce Wayne adopts Dick, Batman goes after Zucco with a vengeance. Following a visit from Batman while denying any involvement in the incident at Haly's Circus, Stromwell becomes enraged at Zucco's actions and kicks him out of the Stromwell Crime Family while disinheriting him, though he does not give him up to the police. After a couple of brief run-ins with Batman, an increasingly paranoid Zucco escapes but returns to Gotham nine years later for the episode's main events. After learning that his parents' murderer has returned, Robin goes after Zucco against Batman's wishes. While hiding at an abandoned amusement park, Zucco is found by Batman and nearly kills him, but Robin arrives and subdues Zucco after the two fight. He almost throws Zucco off the pier, but relents and gives him up to the police, finally finding justice for his family.
 Tony Zucco appears in The Batman episode "A Matter of Family", voiced by Mark Hamill. This version is a mafia don with his three brothers that are his underlings and are all involved in circus acts. His brothers are a strongman (referred to in the credits as Bruiser and voiced by Maurice LaMarche), a lion tamer, and a juggler. As a child, he was part of a knife-throwing duo with his father, with Tony throwing the knives while his father was bound to the giant target but he missed one time, killing his father. When Zucco offers his "protection" to the Flying Graysons, John Grayson refuses. When John is attacked by Zucco's brothers, Dick Grayson calls the police minutes after Zucco first appears in the Flying Graysons' big top tent. The call is intercepted by Batman quickly taking Zucco and his brothers down, resulting in Zucco's "Lion Tamer" brother being taken away by Gotham police while Zucco and the other two brothers escape. Swearing revenge on Batman and the Graysons, Zucco tampers with the railings of the Graysons' trapeze act, resulting in the deaths of John and Mary Grayson. After John's and Mary's murder, Batman corners every one of Zucco's remaining brothers until learning their boss' whereabouts: Haly's Circus. When Zucco knocks Batman out at Haly's Circus, he straps the Dark Knight to a knife-throwing wheel. However, Robin arrives just in time and battles Zucco long enough for Batman to free himself. At one point, Robin has the chance to enact revenge when Zucco falls from the trapeze platform. Robin chooses to save his parents' murderer and Zucco is then arrested by the police.
 Tony Zucco appears in the Titans episode "Jason Todd", portrayed by Richard Zeppieri. As with previous depictions, he is responsible for the murders of John and Mary Grayson. Following his arrest, Zucco agrees to testify against the Maroni family in exchange for a release from prison. Upon learning that Zucco will be released, Dick ambushes a police convoy transporting Zucco with the intent of killing him. When the Maronis also arrive to assassinate Zucco, Dick refuses to help him and allows Zucco to be killed by the mobsters. The Maronis subsequently target Zucco's family with only his son Nick surviving. Blaming Dick for what happened to his family, Nick attempts to avenge their deaths by murdering the other members of Dick's circus troupe, but is ultimately defeated by Dick and Jason Todd.

Film
 In Batman Forever, Zucco is replaced by Two-Face as the murderer of Dick Grayson's parents, who also murders Dick's older brother.

Miscellaneous
Tony Zucco appears in issue #6 of the Young Justice comics. He was featured in a flashback when Robin recaps his history. This version killed John and Mary Grayson as well as Dick's aunt and cousin, and paralyzed his uncle. When Dick Grayson became Robin for the first time, he helped Batman bring Zucco to justice.

See also
 List of Batman family enemies

References

Batman characters
Characters created by Bill Finger
Characters created by Bob Kane
Characters created by Jerry Robinson
Comics characters introduced in 1940
DC Comics male supervillains
DC Comics orphans
Dick Grayson
Fictional immigrants to the United States
Fictional gangsters
Fictional Italian American people
Fictional murderers
Fictional crime bosses